The 2006 Mountain West Conference baseball tournament took place from May 23 through 27. All seven of the league's teams met in the double-elimination tournament held at University of Nevada, Las Vegas's Earl Wilson Stadium. In their first year in the league, top seeded TCU won their first Mountain West Conference Baseball Championship with a championship game score of 9–6 and earned the conference's automatic bid to the 2006 NCAA Division I baseball tournament.

Seeding 
The teams were seeded based on regular season conference winning percentage only. BYU claimed the second seed over San Diego State by winning the season series between the two teams.

Results

All-Tournament Team

Most Valuable Player 
Chad Huffman, a first baseman for the champion TCU Horned Frogs, was named the tournament Most Valuable Player.

References 

Tournament
Mountain West Conference baseball tournament
Mountain West Conference baseball tournament
Mountain West Conference baseball tournament
College baseball tournaments in Nevada
Sports competitions in the Las Vegas Valley